James Connerty (29 March 1904 – 27 July 1988) was a South African cricketer. He played in three first-class matches from 1920/21 to 1929/30.

References

External links
 

1904 births
1988 deaths
South African cricketers
Eastern Province cricketers
Gauteng cricketers
Cricketers from Pretoria